Linda Rose Lindsay (born 28 February 1950) is a New Zealand former cricketer who played as a right-handed batter and right-arm pace bowler. She appeared in two One Day Internationals for New Zealand at the 1978 Women's World Cup. She played domestic cricket for Wellington.

Lindsay was born in Wellington and attended Wellington East Girls' College. Her younger sister, Cheryl Henshilwood, also played international cricket. Lindsay made her debut for Wellington during the 1970–71 season. Her international debut came at the 1978 World Cup in India. Lindsay debuted in New Zealand's second match of the tournament, against India, and took 2/26 from ten overs as her team won by nine wickets. She played her second match in New Zealand's final game, against England, and scored 27 runs from fifth in the batting order, behind only Barb Bevege among her teammates. She was less successful with the ball, however, conceding 16 runs from three overs without taking a wicket. Lindsay finished her career for Wellington after the 1978–79 season.

References

External links

1950 births
Living people
Cricketers from Wellington City
New Zealand women cricketers
New Zealand women One Day International cricketers
Wellington Blaze cricketers